Vene may refer to:

Pterocarpus erinaceus, tree native to West Africa commonly known as vène
Siim-Sander Vene (born 1990), Estonian basketball player for Hapoel Jerusalem of the Israeli Basketball Premier League
 Vene, Finnish boating magazine
Vene means "Russian" in Estonian

See also
Veneküla, name of several villages (küla) in Estonia